"How Do I Let Go" is a song recorded by Canadian country music artist Lisa Brokop. It was released in May 1998 as the first single from her fourth studio album, When You Get to Be You. It peaked at number 19 on the RPM Country Tracks chart in June 1998.

Chart performance

Year-end charts

References

1998 singles
Lisa Brokop songs
Columbia Records singles
Songs written by Karen Taylor-Good
Song recordings produced by Dann Huff
Song recordings produced by Paul Worley